Anubhav may refer to:

 Anubhav (1971 film), a Hindi film
 Anubhav (1986 film), a Bollywood romantic comedy
 Anubhav (2009 film), a Bollywood film

See also 
 Anubhav Plantations